In complex analysis, a branch of mathematics, an amoeba is a set associated with a polynomial in one or more complex variables. Amoebas have applications in algebraic geometry, especially tropical geometry.

Definition

Consider the function

 

defined on the set of all n-tuples  of non-zero complex numbers with values in the Euclidean space  given by the formula
 

Here, log denotes the natural logarithm. If p(z) is a polynomial in  complex variables, its amoeba  is defined as the image of the set of zeros of p under Log, so

 

Amoebas were introduced in 1994 in a book by Gelfand, Kapranov, and Zelevinsky.

Properties

 Any amoeba is a closed set.
 Any connected component of the complement  is convex.
 The area of an amoeba of a not identically zero polynomial in two complex variables is finite.
 A two-dimensional amoeba has a number of "tentacles", which are infinitely long and exponentially narrow towards infinity.

Ronkin function

A useful tool in studying amoebas is the Ronkin function. For p(z), a polynomial in n complex variables, one defines the Ronkin function

 

by the formula

 

where  denotes  Equivalently,  is given by the integral

 

where

 

As an example, the Ronkin function of a monomial

 

References

 
 .

Further reading

External links

 Amoebas of algebraic varieties

Algebraic geometry